County Road 255 is a  road in Oppland County, Norway. It runs from Vinstra in the municipality of Nord-Fron to Lillehammer.

The road is being improved (it is being widened and a pedestrian path and bicycle path are being added) between Hovemoen and Segalstad bru and a connection is being built from Hovemoen to Storhove.

Before January 1, 2010 the route was a national road. It was reclassified as a county road in line with a reform transferring such routes to the counties.

References

External links
Statens vegvesen – trafikkmeldinger Fv255 (Traffic Information: County Road 255)

255